Magarach Ruby or Rubinovyi Magarcha is a red Crimean wine grape variety that is a crossing of Cabernet Sauvignon and Saperavi. The crossing was carried out at the Magarach viticultural institute at Yalta, Crimea in 1928 in what was then the Soviet Union.

Synonyms
Rubinovyi Magarcha is also known under the synonyms Crossing 56, Magarach 56, Magaracha Rubinovyi, Magaratch 56, Roter Rubin Von Magaratsch, Roubinovy Magaratcha, Roubinoy De Magaratch, Rubin Von Magaratch, Rubinovi Magaraca, and Rubinovyi Magaracha.

References

Red wine grape varieties
Russian wine